For Renaissance theatre as subjects, see:

 History of theatre#English Elizabethan theatre
 English Renaissance theatre
 Theatre of France#Renaissance theatre
 Renaissance tragedy

For Renaissance Theatre or Renaissance Theater as venues, see:

 Renaissance Theatre (Mansfield, Ohio), movie palace-type theater
 Renaissance Theatre Company (1987–1992), London-based company founded by Kenneth Branagh and David Parfitt
 Renaissance Ballroom & Casino (formerly known as Renaissance Theatre) (1921–1979), Harlem, Manhattan